Sugo is a 2005-2006 Philippine television series.

Sugo may also refer to:

 Sugo Station, a railway station in Takizawa, Iwate, Japan
 Sportsland SUGO, a motorsports facility in Murata, Miyagi, Japan
 Sugo Corporation, a fictional company in the Japanese anime series Future GPX Cyber Formula
 Asuka Sugō, a fictional character in the series
 Osamu Sugō, a fictional character in the series
 Sugo, a 1976 album by Eugenio Finardi
 Sugó, the Hungarian name for Șugău village, Sighetu Marmației city, Maramureș County, Romania
 Sugo, an Italian word that sometimes refers to tomato sauce

People with the surname
 Takayuki Sugō (born 1952), Japanese voice actor
 Masaki Suda (born 1993, as Taisho Sugo), Japanese actor